Mücü (also, Myudzhyu) is a village and municipality in the Ismailli Rayon of Azerbaijan. It has a population of 229. The working population is mostly engaged in agriculture. The city is supplied with electricity. The region of the village is located in the "Bado-Basgal" tourism region. The tourism route going through the "Khan" , "Fit daghi" and "Haram towers" passes close to the village.

History 
Although the precise history of the village is not known, it is agreed that the village was founded around the time of Caucasian Albania. Reference to the Caucasian Albania in the village can be found on the higher areas of he village, where remains of residences of Albanians can be found.

Geography and Climate 
The terrain of the village is mountainous. The summers are calm, afternoons hot and nights cold. The winters are very cold.

Population 
According to the population census in 1999, the population of the village was 299. In 2009 the population fell to 249 people.
In 1919 230 people were murdered by Armenian militia.
The population right now is 241 people, of which 113 are men, and 128 are women.

Education 
There is only one educational institution in the village. It is the No 1 village secondary school.

Historical monuments 
Even though there are no monuments of national importance in the village, there are many historical sights located there. Caucasian Albanian monuments, an ancient Jewish cemetery belonging to Mountain Jews and the remains of a summer residence of the Khan of Shamakhy Khanate Mustapha Khan are some of important monuments in the village.

References 

Populated places in Ismayilli District